C38 or C-38 may refer to:

Vehicles 
Aircraft
 Cessna C-38, an American civil utility aircraft
 Douglas C-38, an American military transport aircraft
 Gulfstream C-38A Courier, an American military transport aircraft

Ships
 , a C-class submarine of the Royal Navy

Surface vehicles
 Alfa Romeo Racing C38, an Italian Formula One car
 Carlsson C38, a German performance car
 New South Wales C38 class locomotive, an Australian steam locomotive

Other uses 
 C-38 (cipher machine), an American mechanical cipher machine
 C-38 (Michigan county highway)
 C38 road (Namibia)
 Bill C-38, various legislation of the Parliament of Canada
 Caldwell 38, a spiral galaxy
 Heart cancer
 King's Gambit, a chess opening
 C-38 Canal, a straightened channel of the Kissimmee River